The Noquet were a group of Native Americans who lived on the Upper Peninsula in Michigan.  They spoke an Algonquian language.  They are thought to have been most closely related to the Menominee Indians.

References

Sources
Waldman, Carl.  The Encyclopedia of Native American Tribes.  (New York: Checkmark Books, 2006) p. 10

Native American tribes in Michigan
Menominee tribe